Rupert W. "Rupie" Phillips, Jr. (born February 17, 1969) is an American politician and a Republican member of the West Virginia Senate since 2020. Prior to his election to the Senate, he served in the West Virginia House of Delegates representing the 19th and 24th Districts from 2011 to 2019.

Politics 
First elected as a Democrat to the House of Delegates in 2010, Phillips switched his party registration from Democrat to Independent after the 2016 elections. After a few months as an independent in 2017, Phillips became a Republican and announced a run for the Third Congressional District seat, being vacated by then-Representative Evan Jenkins in 2018. Phillips finished second in the primary to future Congresswoman and then-fellow Delegate Carol Miller.

After his unsuccessful Congressional run, Phillips ran as the Republican nominee for the West Virginia Senate 7th District in 2020, where he beat then-Democratic Delegate Ralph Rodighiero in the general election.

Personal
Phillips graduated from Man High School. At one point, the license plate on his personal vehicle spelled "COALDEL," for coal delegate, and his twitter biography read, “I eat coal for breakfast.” reflecting his support of the coal industry.

He was arrested and charged with domestic battery in 2012. In January 2016, Phillips garnered national headlines for handing out bottles of sunscreen to other Delegates on the House floor to ridicule global warming.

Phillips was subject to national ridicule when he was unaware that power plants that operate using coal and natural gas are forced to go offline when temperatures approach 0F since the water cooling inlets freeze at such temperatures preventing operation.

Elections
Senate:

U.S. House: 

House of Delegates:

2012: After being redistricted to District 24 alongside former delegate Lidella Hrutkay, Phillips ran in the seven-way Democratic Primary and placed first with 2,917 votes (26.2%) ahead of Ted Tomblin, who placed second, and former Representative Hrutkay, who took third. Phillips and Tomblin were unopposed for the November general election where Phillips placed second with 6,861 votes (47.4%).

2010: Phillips ran in the eleven-way Democratic Primary and placed third with 3,205 votes (13.0%) ahead of former delegate Ted Ellis. The frontrunners won the six-way four-position November general election where Phillips placed fourth with 8,672 votes (18.1%) behind incumbent Representatives Ralph Rodighiero, Greg Butcher, and Josh Stowers and ahead of Republican nominees Chad Story and Elias Gregory, who had run for the seat in 2006.

2008: Phillips ran in the twelve-way Democratic Primary, but did not place in the top four in the multimember district. The frontrunners were unopposed for the four-position General election.

See also
 List of American politicians who switched parties in office

References

External links
Official page at the West Virginia Legislature

Rupert Phillips, Jr. at Ballotpedia
Rupert (Rupie) Phillips, Jr. at the National Institute on Money in State Politics

Place of birth missing (living people)
1969 births
Living people
People from Logan County, West Virginia
West Virginia Democrats
21st-century American politicians
West Virginia Independents
West Virginia Republicans